"The Story in Your Eyes" is a 1971 hit single by the English rock band the Moody Blues.  Written by the band's guitarist Justin Hayward, it was first released as a single with "My Song" on the B-side, and then on the 1971 album Every Good Boy Deserves Favour shortly after.

Background
"The Story in Your Eyes" was the Moody Blues' last single to feature the Mellotron as it would be supplanted by the Chamberlin, a similar instrument, in time for their next album, Seventh Sojourn. The SACD release of the album Every Good Boy Deserves Favour contains a version of "The Story in Your Eyes" that has the Mellotron in dominant role.

Allmusic critic Lindsay Planer described it as "one of the Moody Blues’ edgier pieces" with "decidedly probing observational lyrics." Cashbox described it as a "scorching rocker" that is "certain to make quite an impact in underground and pop markets."

Classic Rock History critic Brian Kachejian rated it as the Moody Blues' 2nd greatest song, saying that "The song’s classic opening guitar lick is easily one of the most recognizable in classic rock history" and praising the vocal performances, the lead guitar playing and the Mellotron playing.  Ultimate Classic Rock critic Nick DeRiso rated it as the Moody Blues' 3rd greatest song.

Personnel
 Justin Hayward – double-tracked vocals, acoustic and electric guitar
 John Lodge – bass guitar, backing vocals
 Mike Pinder – Mellotron, piano, backing vocals
 Ray Thomas – tambourine, backing vocals
 Graeme Edge – drums, percussion

Chart positions

Cover versions
Stiv Bators released the song as a single in 1987 on Bomp! Records, backed with "Have Love, Will Travel".  It is included on Bators' retrospective CD L.A. L.A..
Fountains of Wayne recorded a cover version of the song for their 2011 album Sky Full of Holes. It was available only as an Amazon.com MP3 bonus track.

References 

The Moody Blues songs
1971 singles
Songs written by Justin Hayward
1971 songs